Li Bin (born October 1954) is a Chinese politician of Manchu descent from Fushun, in Liaoning province. She was the only Minister in charge of the National Health and Family Planning Commission existing from March 2013 to March 2018. She currently served as one of the vice-chairpersons of the 13th National Committee of the Chinese People's Political Consultative Conference since March 2018.

She graduated from Jilin University with a degree in economics, and went on to receive her doctorate and conduct research in the same field.  Li is a member of the Chinese Communist Party. She was chairperson and party secretary of the National Population and Family Planning Commission (2008–2011). She became vice- and acting governor of Anhui province in 2011, and was Governor of the province from February 2012 to March 2013. She is only the fourth woman to assume the Governorship of a provincial level division in China, following Gu Xiulian, Uyunqimg and Song Xiuyan.

After graduating from Jilin University, Li continued to work in Jilin province. During her thirty years working in the province, Li worked in a variety of roles, including as deputy governor. In August 2007, she became the deputy chairperson and party secretary of the National Population and Family Planning Commission. She was promoted to Chairperson in March 2008.

At the first plenary session of the 12th National People's Congress in March 2013, she was elected as the first chairperson of the newly formed National Health and Family Planning Commission.

Li is a member of the 17th and 18th, also 19th Central Committees of the Chinese Communist Party.

References

External links 
 

1954 births
Manchu people
People's Republic of China politicians from Liaoning
Living people
Jilin University alumni
Chinese Communist Party politicians from Liaoning
Politicians from Fushun
Political office-holders in Anhui
Chinese women in politics
Vice Chairpersons of the National Committee of the Chinese People's Political Consultative Conference